Alice Ellen Lauentine Charbonnet  (12 October 1858, Cincinnati, Ohio – 1 June 1914, Paris, France) was a French-Australian composer of romantic and classical music. 
Her father was a French judge, and her formative years were spent in a variety of countries. 
She married violinist Frederick William Kellermann; their daughter Annette Kellermann was a long-distance swimmer, vaudeville entertainer, film actress, and educator.

Alice and Frederick established a music school in Phillip Street, Sydney, and Alice became a distinguished figure on Sydney's concert scene. She gave many afternoon recitals at gatherings at Phillip Street and at her home in Potts Point, and appeared in many larger concerts. After moving to Melbourne in 1901 without her husband, Alice became a music teacher at Simpson's School, Mentone, where she commanded a high fees because of her experience and the high results she obtained with students. In 1907 she retired to Paris, but continued giving concerts.

Her piano students included Dame Nellie Melba, composer Lydia Larner and May Summerbelle

Works
 1892 Saltarella  in A minor
 1898 Le train du diable, galop de concert
 Ye Olde English Dances
 Tarantella
 Mappari
 Brise de mer 
 Remembrance, song
 Danse Mexicaine
 Ave Maria, for solo voice, violin and piano or organ

References

Further reading

"Alice Ellen Charbonnet: a French musician in nineteenth-century Australia" by J. G. Bong, 2006 Masters thesis, Faculty of Music, University of Melbourne

External links

1858 births
1914 deaths
19th-century classical composers
American emigrants to Australia
Australian women classical composers
Australian women composers
Australian composers
19th-century women composers
American people of French descent
Australian people of French descent